The first hat-trick, a player scoring three goals in a game, in Major League Soccer, was scored by Steve Rammel of D.C. United in their 5–2 win at the Columbus Crew on May 15, 1996.

The league's fastest hat-trick was scored in under five minutes by Harut Karapetyan of the LA Galaxy on June 4, 1998, in an 8–1 win at the Dallas Burn. The fastest hat-trick from the start of a game was scored by Hany Mukhtar of Nashville SC, who  recorded three goals in the opening 16 minutes of a 5–1 victory against Chicago Fire FC on July 18, 2021 (the goals all came in a six-minute window). Clint Mathis scored the most goals in a game, when he scored five, on August 26, 2000 in a 6–4 MetroStars win over the Burn.

Roy Lassiter scored hat-tricks for the Tampa Bay Mutiny and D.C. United. Dante Washington scored hat-tricks for the Burn and the Crew. Mamadou Diallo scored three hat-tricks for the Mutiny and another for the MetroStars, twice scoring four goals in a game.

Eight rookie players have scored hat-tricks, the first being Brian Maisonneuve on September 7, 1996 for the Crew in a 5–1 home win over the Kansas City Wiz, and the most recent being Cyle Larin for Orlando City SC against New York City FC in 2015.

Hat-tricks

1990s

Note: The results column shows the scorer's team score first

2000s

2010s

2020s

Multiple hat-tricks
The following table lists the number of hat-tricks scored by players who have scored two or more hat-tricks. This list does not include playoff hat-tricks. Players whose names are in bold are still currently active in Major League Soccer. As of October 9, 2022.

Hat-tricks by nationality
The following table lists the number of hat-tricks scored by players from a single nation. This list does not include playoff hat-tricks. As of October 9, 2022.

Hat-tricks in MLS Cup Playoffs

References

Hat-tricks
Major League Soccer